Castagnaro is a comune (municipality) in the Province of Verona in the Italian region Veneto, located about  southwest of Venice and about  southeast of Verona.

The municipality of Castagnaro contains the frazioni (subdivisions, mainly villages and hamlets) Menà and Vallestrema.

Castagnaro borders the following municipalities: Badia Polesine, Giacciano con Baruchella, Terrazzo, and Villa Bartolomea.

Castagnaro is also the sight of one of the most famous battles of the condottieri era.

Demographic evolution

Twin towns
Castagnaro is twinned with:

  Fischbachau, Germany

References

External links
 City hall of Castagnaro
 Parish von Castagnaro

Cities and towns in Veneto